Coleg Harlech was a residential adult education college for mature students in Harlech, Gwynedd, later on part of Adult Learning Wales - Addysg Oedolion Cymru.

History 
It was Wales' only long-term, mature-student residential education college and was established in 1927 by Thomas Jones, Deputy Secretary to the Cabinet under four prime ministers including David Lloyd George and Stanley Baldwin, to continue the work of Workers' Educational Association in a residential environment, with Ben Bowen Thomas as its first warden. Plas Wernfawr was acquired at a knock-down price from a seller sympathetic to the project to be the base for the college.

Starting with just six students, mostly from the South Wales Coalfield area, numbers increased to 30 in the 1930s, 70 in the 1960s, serving the whole of Wales. Then, with Ieuan Jeffries-Jones as warden, Coleg Harlech began offering a two-year diploma course validated by the University of Wales, which became a preparation for university education for those who had missed out on earlier education: it became well known as a "second chance" college, often for people who, for economic or social reasons, never had a first chance.

By the 1980s and 1990s, higher education institutions generally were growing, and expanding access opportunities wider than before. This began to threaten Coleg Harlech’s niche, and ultimately Coleg Harlech, once funded as a unique institution in Wales, came under the funding regime with other further education colleges, and became less distinctive.

Coleg Harlech always had a close association with the WEA and merged with WEA (North Wales) in 2001 to become Coleg Harlech Workers' Educational Association North Wales (CHWEAN); CHWEAN subsequently evolved via two further mergers into Adult Learning Wales, which operated the site until its sale in 2019.

The college's residential students were once supported financially by bursaries from the Welsh Government, previously the Welsh Office, but as access to higher and further education widenened and the college's provision became less distinctive, these came to an end, in effect bringing about the termination of residential courses.

Closure and after
In February 2017 it was announced that Coleg Harlech would be closing as an adult education site at the end of the academic year. It was sold to local businessman Leslie Banks Irvine in April 2019, but then put on sale again in September that year as four properties with a total asking price of around £630,000.

In 2021 a petition to the Welsh Government stating "The Welsh Government should re-purchase and refurbish Coleg Harlech" gained 6,666 signatures.

In around February 2022, the Welsh Government approved some funding for emergency works to protect the buildings.

Name 
The institution has always been named, simply, Coleg Harlech: there is no ‘English version’ of the name even though it translates as 'Harlech College'.

Buildings

Plas Wernfawr 

The campus is centred on Plas Wernfawr, a house originally built in 1907–08 for George Davison, and designed in Arts and Crafts style by the radical architect George Henry Walton. The building is in simple classical style, built of dressed blocks of local grey stone. The east front demonstrates strong horizontal lines, formed by two rows of sash windows, a projecting dentilated string course at eaves height forming the base of a pediment which contains a central oculus. Walton also laid out the garden. After it became Coleg Harlech, a library wing was added, designed by local architect Griffith Morris in an Art Deco style. Plas Wernfawr, together with the terraces revetment walls of the garden on the seaward side is a Grade II* listed building. The forecourt and garden structures on the inland side are listed Grade II.

Art collection 
Plas Wernfawr once held a collection of artworks which had been donated or purchased by the college over the years. However, a financial crisis at the college in 2013 forced the sale of these artefacts and many rare books from the college library.

Theatre 

The Great Hall, part of Walton's original design, was destroyed by fire in 1968. It was replaced by a brutalist theatre building, designed by Gerald Latter for Colwyn Foulkes & Partners. The theatre building was opened as Theatr Ardudwy in 1973 but subsequently changed its name to Theatr Harlech. It was operated by a separate body from the college until the Coleg closed its doors to learners in 2017. It is considered by The Twentieth Century Society to be a building at risk, along with the college's 12-storey residential tower, also designed by Latter in 1968.

It was reported in 2021 that the theatre "could be set to reopen", after previous reports of police investigations into earlier plans.

Other buildings 

The campus also includes a Gymnasium built c. 1970 to designs by Colwyn Foulkes and an Amenity Centre, designed in 1985 by the Percy Thomas Partnership. Other buildings including a concrete tower block once used for accommodation and Wern Fach, once the Warden's residence.

References 

Notes

Bibliography
 Davidson, Andrew (2008) Coleg Harlech: Archaeological Assessment Gwynedd Archaeological Trust report number 761
 England, Joe (ed.) (2007) Changing Lives: Workers’ Education in Wales 1907–2007 
 Stead, Peter (1977) Coleg Harlech: The First Fifty Years, 
 White, Eirene (1977) Thomas Jones: Founder of Coleg Harlech,

External links 
 WEA YMCA CC Cymru
 A Requiem for Coleg Harlech documentary

Further education colleges in Gwynedd
Further education colleges in Snowdonia
Grade II* listed buildings in Gwynedd
1927 establishments in Wales
Educational institutions established in 1927